Klas Frans Åhlund (born 11 April 1972) is a Swedish songwriter, record producer, and guitarist. He is the founding member of the Swedish rock band Teddybears. As a songwriter and producer, he has worked with artists such as Robyn, Sugababes, Jordin Sparks, Teddybears, Eagle-Eye Cherry, Kesha, Kylie Minogue, Bo Kaspers Orkester, Britney Spears, Melody Club, Katy Perry, Madonna, and Ghost. He received a nomination for the Grammy Award for Best Dance/Electronic Recording for producing Robyn's 2011 single "Call Your Girlfriend".

He is the brother of musician Joakim Åhlund who is a member of the Swedish alternative rock band Caesars. Åhlund has been married to Swedish singer Paola Bruna.

Discography

References

1972 births
Living people
Musicians from Stockholm
Swedish record producers
Swedish songwriters